The 2014 Western Kentucky Hilltoppers football team represented Western Kentucky University (WKU) in the 2014 NCAA Division I FBS football season. They were led by first- year head coach Jeff Brohm and played their home games at Houchens Industries–L. T. Smith Stadium. This was the team's first year as a Conference USA member and playing in the East Division. They finished the season 8–5, 4–4 in C-USA play to finish in a three-way tie for third place in the East Division. They were invited to the Bahamas Bowl where they defeated Central Michigan.

Previous season
The 2013 Western Kentucky Hilltoppers football team finished the 2013 season 8–4 overall and 4–3 in Sun Belt Conference play. The Hilltoppers biggest win was against season opener Kentucky by 35–26. WKU became bowl eligible after defeating Army but did not receive a bowl invite due to the number of invites the Sun Belt Conference receives. After five years of competing in the Sun Belt, WKU moved to Conference USA on July 1, 2014.

Schedule
Western Kentucky announced their 2014 football schedule on February 3, 2014. The 2014 schedule consist of 6 home games and 6 away games in the regular season. The Hilltoppers will host CUSA foes Old Dominion, UAB, UTEP, and UTSA, and will travel to Florida Atlantic, Marshall, Middle Tennessee, and Louisiana Tech.

The Hilltoppers will play four opponents for the first time this season, Illinois, Old Dominion, UTEP, and UTSA. Western Kentucky will compete for the first time in the East division of Conference USA which has seven schools in total while the West division has six. Due to the two uneven divisions, WKU will only play five schools from the East division and will not play Florida International this season. Western Kentucky will play three teams from the West division, Louisiana Tech, UTEP, and UTSA, which will complete the eight conference games each member of the CUSA has to play.

Schedule Source:

Game summaries

Bowling Green

Illinois

Middle Tennessee

Navy

UAB

Florida Atlantic

Old Dominion

Louisiana Tech

UTEP

Army

UTSA

Marshall

Central Michigan–Bahamas Bowl

References

WKU
Western Kentucky Hilltoppers football seasons
Bahamas Bowl champion seasons
Western Kentucky Hilltoppers football